Dunlapsville is an unincorporated community in Liberty Township, Union County, in the U.S. state of Indiana.

History
Dunlapsville is named for one of its first settlers, John Dunlap.

A post office was established at Dunlapsville in 1818, and remained in operation until it was discontinued in 1903.

Geography

References

Unincorporated communities in Union County, Indiana
Unincorporated communities in Indiana